Muhammad Zahid Durrani is a Pakistani politician who had been a Member of the Provincial Assembly of Khyber Pakhtunkhwa, from May 2013 to May 2018.

Political career

He was elected to the Provincial Assembly of Khyber Pakhtunkhwa as a candidate of Pakistan Tehreek-e-Insaf (PTI) from Constituency PK-24 Mardan-II in 2013 Pakistani general election. He received 12,302 votes and defeated a candidate of Awami National Party.

In March 2018, he was accused of horse-trading in the 2018 Senate election. Following which Imran Khan announced to expel him from the party and served him a show cause notice, to explain his position.  In April 2018, he quit PTI and joined Pakistan Peoples Party.

References

Living people
Khyber Pakhtunkhwa MPAs 2013–2018
Year of birth missing (living people)